Norcross is an Anglo-Saxon locational surname, for someone from Norcross near Poulton-le-Fylde, Lancashire, England.

Notable people with the surname include:
Alastair Norcross, philosopher and professor at University of Colorado
Bryan Norcross, meteorologist and hurricane specialist
Daniel Norcross, cricket commentator
Donald Norcross (born 1958), American politician
Emily Norcross Dickinson, Mother of American poet Emily Dickinson
George Norcross (born 1956), businessman and prominent political figure in New Jersey
John C. Norcross, psychologist, author, and professor at the University of Scranton
Jonathan Norcross, Atlanta pioneer
Kirk Norcross, English reality television celebrity
Pliny Norcross, American politician
The Norcross Brothers, American builders and construction associates of architect H.H. Richardson

Fictional people
James Norcross, fictional President of the United States in the cartoon series Super President

References

English toponymic surnames